Helmolepis is an extinct genus of ray-finned fish that lived during the Early Triassic epoch in what is now Greenland, Madagascar and Canada (British Columbia). This genus is closely related with Platysiagum.

See also
 List of prehistoric bony fish genera

References

Further reading
 
 

Prehistoric neopterygii
Early Triassic fish
Triassic fish of North America
Prehistoric fish of Africa